Seymsky is a rural locality (a khutor) in Dolzhenkovsky Selsoviet Rural Settlement, Oktyabrsky District, Kursk Oblast, Russia. Population:

Geography 
The khutor is located on the Seym River (a left tributary of the Desna), 72 km from the Russia–Ukraine border, 17 km south-west of Kursk, 4 km north-west of the district center – the urban-type settlement Pryamitsyno, 4.5 km from the selsoviet center – Bolshoye Dolzhenkovo.

 Streets
There is Sosnovaya Street and 54 houses.

 Climate
Seymsky has a warm-summer humid continental climate (Dfb in the Köppen climate classification).

Transport 
Seymsky is located 12.5 km from the federal route  Crimea Highway (a part of the European route ), 2.5 km from the road of regional importance  (Kursk – Lgov – Rylsk – border with Ukraine), on the road of intermunicipal significance  (Dyakonovo – Starkovo – Sokolovka), 5 km from the nearest railway halt 439 km (railway line Lgov I — Kursk).

The rural locality is situated 29 km from Kursk Vostochny Airport, 123 km from Belgorod International Airport and 232 km from Voronezh Peter the Great Airport.

References

Notes

Sources

Rural localities in Oktyabrsky District, Kursk Oblast